Sp100 nuclear antigen is an interferon stimulated antigen found in the cell nuclei of many human and higher animal cells. Autoantibodies directed against Sp100 are often found in patients with primary biliary cirrhosis. Histologically Sp100 'dots' regions of the cell nucleus. Viral infection and mitogens affect the expression of the Sp100 autoantigen. Cells grown in the presence of interferons (α, β, and γ) revealed an increase both in size and number of the Sp100 protein-containing nuclear dots and increase the protein concentration. 
This raises "the question whether cytokine-mediated increase of Sp100 protein expression plays a role in induction of anti-Sp100 autoantibodies."

Sp100 and nuclear dots 

Two proteins, Sp100 and promyelocytic leukemia (PML) factor are localized to punctate domains in the nucleus (nuclear dots or nuclear bodies). These domains (few to 20) were found to form a donut shaped structure when cells were starved of amino acids. In particular, depravation of cystine results in most pronounced changes. Two other proteins,  PIC1/SUMO-1, that also interact with nuclear pore complex factors also interact with these two proteins. In addition Sp100 interacts with a chromatin binding protein, HP1 alpha.

Sp100 splicoforms 

Some Sp100 variants contain a domain similar to two interferon-inducible nuclear phosphoproteins, suppressin and DEAF1. This defines a novel protein motif, the HNPP-box. Another class of variants has high mobility group 1 (HMG1) protein sequence as a domain. Both major classes of Sp100 splice variant proteins localize in part to nuclear dots/PML bodies and other nuclear domains.

References

Autoantigens